The Janesville Shale or Janesville Formation is a geologic formation in Kansas, Oklahoma, and Nebraska dating to the late Carboniferous period.

See also

 List of fossiliferous stratigraphic units in Kansas
 List of fossiliferous stratigraphic units in Oklahoma
 List of fossiliferous stratigraphic units in Nebraska
 Paleontology in Kansas
 Paleontology in Oklahoma
 Paleontology in Nebraska

References

Carboniferous Kansas
Carboniferous geology of Nebraska
Carboniferous southern paleotropical deposits